Justin Mortimer is an American former world champion swimmer. He was a 13-time All-American for the Minnesota Golden Gophers.

International career
At the 2003 Summer Universiade Mortimer took silver in the 400m freestyle.  At the 2005 Summer Universiade Mortimer took gold in the 1500m freestyle, silver in the 400m freestyle, and bronze as part of the 4x200 relay team.

At the 2004 FINA World Swimming Championships (25 m) Mortimer was a gold medalist as part of the United States 4x200 relay team as well as a bronze medalist in the 400m freestyle.

References

Living people
American male freestyle swimmers
Medalists at the FINA World Swimming Championships (25 m)
Universiade medalists in swimming
Year of birth missing (living people)
Universiade gold medalists for the United States
Medalists at the 2005 Summer Universiade
Medalists at the 2003 Summer Universiade